Willa Beatrice Brown (January 22, 1906 – July 18, 1992) was an American aviator, lobbyist, teacher, and civil rights activist. She was the first African American woman to earn a pilot's license in the United States, the first African American woman to run for the United States Congress, first African American officer in the Civil Air Patrol, and first woman in the U.S. to have both a pilot's license and an aircraft mechanic's license.

She was a lifelong advocate for gender and racial equality in the field of aviation as well as in the military. She not only lobbied the U.S. government to integrate the United States Army Air Corps and include African Americans in the Civilian Pilot Training Program (CPTP), she and Cornelius Coffey co-founded the Coffey School of Aeronautics, distinguishing it as the first private flight training academy owned and operated by African Americans in the United States. She trained hundreds of pilots, several of whom went on to become Tuskegee Airmen; the creation of the Tuskegee Airmen has been credited to Brown's training efforts.

Brown remained politically and socially active in Chicago long after the Coffey School closed in 1945. She ran in Congressional primary elections in 1946 and 1950 and taught in the Chicago Public School System until 1971, when she retired at age 65. Following her retirement, she served on the Federal Aviation Administration's Women's Advisory Committee until 1974.

Early life 
Willa Beatrice Brown was born to Eric and Hallie Brown on January 22, 1906, in Glasgow, Kentucky. She graduated from Wiley High School in Terre Haute, Indiana, and attended Indiana State Teachers College where she graduated in 1927 with a bachelor's degree. Ten years later she earned an M.B.A. from Northwestern University.

Brown taught in Gary, Indiana, at Emerson High School's Roosevelt Annex from 1927 to 1932. She then moved to Chicago, where she worked in a variety of jobs, including secretarial work, social work, and teaching. In 1934, she met John C. Robinson, who introduced her to the Challenger Air Pilots Association, a group of African American pilots.

Aviation Career 

In 1934, Brown began studying at Chicago's racially segregated Harlem Field with certified flight instructor Cornelius Coffey, an expert in the field of aviation mechanics. She was one of few women who attended Curtiss–Wright Aeronautical University where she studied aircraft maintenance and earned an aircraft mechanic's license in 1935. She earned a private pilot's license in 1938 and a commercial pilot's license in 1939, becoming the first African American woman to earn either type of license in the United States.

Willa Brown, Cornelius Coffey and Enoch P. Waters worked together to form the National Negro Airmen Association of America, later renamed to National Airmen's Association of America which was incorporated in 1939. Their primary mission was to attract more interest in aviation, help develop a better understanding in the field of aeronautics, and increase African American participation in both fields. Brown was the national secretary and president of the organization's Chicago branch, and an activist for racial equality. She also took on public relations duties for the organization, and flew to colleges and spoke on the radio to get African Americans interested in flying. She and Coffey started the Coffey School of Aeronautics in Chicago, located at Harlem Airport. They established the school for the purpose of training black pilots and teaching aviation mechanics.

She lobbied the government as an advocate for the integration of black pilots into a then-segregated Army Air Corps and federal Civilian Pilot Training Program (CPTP).  She also worked to disprove a 1925 Army War College study which had deemed African Americans unfit to fly. She lobbied the federal government to award CPTP contracts to train African American pilots. In 1940, she was appointed coordinator of the Chicago units of the CPTP, and the Coffey School was selected by the U.S. Army Air Corps as a feeder school to provide black students to its pilot training program. Nearly 200 students from the school went on to join the Tuskegee Airmen. In 1942, she attained the rank of Lieutenant in Civil Air Patrol Squadron 613-6, becoming the first African American officer in the Civil Air Patrol. She was later appointed war-training service coordinator for the Civil Aeronautics Authority.

Postwar Career 
In 1946, Brown ran in the Republican Party primary elections for Illinois's 1st congressional district, becoming the first African American woman to run in a congressional primary election. Her campaign focused on improving the opportunities for African Americans, including creating an airport owned and used by African Americans. She was defeated by William E. King. She ran for the same Congressional seat in the 1950 Republican primary election, and was defeated by Archibald Carey Jr.

Brown returned to teaching in high schools from 1962 until her retirement in 1971. She taught business and aeronautics. She served on the Women's Advisory Committee of the Federal Aviation Administration from 1972 to 1975. She was the first black woman to serve on that committee.

Personal life 
Brown was married three times. Her first marriage was to Wilbur J. Hardaway, an African American firefighter. They met while Brown was teaching in Gary, Indiana, married in 1929, and divorced in 1931.

Brown was described as follows:

In 1947, she and Cornelius Coffey married, but the marriage did not last long. Her final marriage was to Reverend J. H. Chappell, pastor of the Chicago West Side Community Church, in 1955. She was a widow by 1991.

Awards and recognition 
In 1939, Brown was cited in the 76th Congressional Record for achievements in aviation.
Time magazine profiled Brown in its September 25, 1939 issue.
In 2002, Women in Aviation International named Brown one of the 100 most influential women in aviation and space.
In 2003, a decade after her death, Willa Beatrice Brown was inducted into the Kentucky Aviation Hall of Fame.
In 2010, Brown was awarded the Distinguished Alumni Award by the Indiana State University Alumni Association.
Historical marker #238, located at the intersection of Race and Washington Streets in Glasgow, Kentucky. The marker was erected in recognition of Willa Brown Chappell, "the first African American woman to earn a pilot's license in the United States".
In 2022 Brown was enshrined in the National Aviation Hall of Fame.

Notes

References

Further reading 

1906 births
1992 deaths
People from Glasgow, Kentucky
Military personnel from Kentucky
20th-century American educators
African-American female military personnel
American women in World War II
Indiana State University alumni
Women in the United States Army
American women aviators
Kentucky women aviators
African-American aviators
African-American women aviators
20th-century African-American women
20th-century African-American people
20th-century African-American educators
African-American United States Army personnel